The Nine O'Clock News may refer to:

 RTÉ News: Nine O'Clock (1961–present)
 BBC Nine O'Clock News (1970–2000)
 KBS Nine O'Clock News, also known as KBS News 9 (1973–present)
 Not the Nine O'Clock News (1979–1982)
 Not Necessarily the News, based on Not the Nine O'Clock News (1983–1990)

See also
 One O'Clock News (disambiguation)
 Five O'Clock News (disambiguation)
 Six O'Clock News (disambiguation)
 Ten O'Clock News (disambiguation)